Two of Us is the title of the tenth volume in Solid Air Records' "Groovemasters" series.  It was recorded by guitarist Phil Keaggy and Mike Pachelli, released in 2006.

Track listing
"Maccadocious"
"Bears Den Road"
"Westside Talkin'"
"Birds"
"Remember When"
"Beatified"
"For John & Val"
"Old Friends"
"County Down Revisited"
"Song of the Woods"
"Self Duet"
"Baggend"
"The Walk"

Personnel
Phil Keaggy - Guitars
Mike Pachelli - Guitars

Production notes
James Jensen - Executive Producer
Bill Wolf - Mastering

References

2006 albums
Phil Keaggy albums